Same-sex marriage in Finland has been legal since 1 March 2017. A bill for the legalisation of same-sex marriages was approved by the Finnish Parliament in a vote of 101–90 on 12 December 2014 and signed into law by President Sauli Niinistö on 20 February 2015. Further legislation to harmonise other laws with the legalisation of same-sex marriage was passed in 2016. The law took effect on 1 March 2017. Finland was the last Nordic sovereign state to legalise same-sex marriage, the 13th country in Europe overall, and the 21st worldwide.

Previously, from 2002 until 2017, Finland recognized registered partnerships for same-sex couples, which provided the same rights and responsibilities as marriage with the exception of joint adoption rights and the right to a joint last name.

Registered partnerships
Legislation introducing registered partnerships for same-sex couples was passed by the Parliament of Finland on 28 September 2001 with a vote of 99–84. The law went into effect on 1 March 2002. Registered partnerships, which were available only to same-sex couples, provided the same rights and responsibilities as marriage for opposite-sex couples, except for adoption rights and the ability to take a common family name, and they were registered and dissolved using a procedure similar to that for civil marriage. The legislation also granted immigration rights to a foreign partner.

The Parliament revised the law in May 2009, allowing a person in a registered partnership to adopt the biological children of their partner. On 1 March 2017, the ability to enter into a registered partnership was closed off. No further partnerships are granted in Finland, and existing registered partners only retain their status if they do not marry.

Same-sex marriage

Same-sex marriage has been legal in Finland since 1 March 2017. Legislation to open marriage to same-sex couples passed the Parliament of Finland on 12 December 2014 with support from the Social Democratic Party (SDP), the Green League, the Left Alliance, the Swedish People's Party and the National Coalition Party (NCP). The Finns Party, the Christian Democrats and the Centre Party opposed same-sex marriage, though the latter has since rejected attempts to repeal the same-sex marriage law. In Finnish public discourse, same-sex marriage is commonly referred to as "equal marriage" or "gender-neutral marriage".

2007–2011 parliamentary term
A poll conducted by Christian newspaper Kotimaa in March 2010 showed that a narrow majority of Finnish MPs opposed same-sex marriage. Of the 126 MPs who were asked if they would support a gender-neutral marriage law, 46% were in favour and 54% were opposed. 63% of Social Democratic lawmakers supported same-sex marriage as well as all MPs from the Greens and the Left Alliance. A majority of MPs from the Centre Party and the National Coalition Party opposed same-sex marriage. However, a later survey in April 2010 by Helsingin Sanomat reported that there was cross-party support for same-sex marriage and joint adoption rights. The Secretary of the National Coalition Party, Taru Tujunen, said that an initiative on same-sex marriage would be put forward at the next party conference. At their June 2010 party conference, the NCP delegates voted in favor of a gender-neutral marriage law, though the vice-chairman of the NCP parliamentary group, Ben Zyskowicz, said that a majority of NCP MPs were against it. Two weeks earlier, the Social Democrats passed a measure in favor of same-sex marriage. The Left Alliance and the Green League also support it. Foreign Minister Alexander Stubb, who held a speech at the opening ceremony of Helsinki Pride week on 28 June 2010, said he supports a gender-neutral marriage law with full adoption rights for same-sex couples.

On 2 July 2010, Justice Minister Tuija Brax announced that the Ministry of Justice would be preparing a reform to the Marriage Act in the autumn of 2011. It was considered possible that same-sex marriage would be legalized after the 2011 parliamentary elections, where it was speculated to turn into a major theme, though in an August 2010 survey by Yle only 20% of respondents said the issue should be a major theme.

2011–2015 parliamentary term
According to the voting advice application of the Helsingin Sanomat newspaper, 90 of the 200 MPs elected in April 2011 supported joint adoption rights for same-sex couples, while 93 MPs opposed it. Upon joining the Katainen Cabinet, the Christian Democrats required assurance that no government bill would legalise same-sex marriage. However, it was agreed during talks on government formation that, if proposed as a member's initiative by individual MPs, such a bill could be endorsed by the remaining five parties in government: the National Coalition Party, the Social Democrats, the Left Alliance, the Green League and the Swedish People's Party. The legislative proposal was presented as a member's initiative on 29 September 2011.

On 21 March 2012, after five months of signature gathering among MPs, the bill to legalize same-sex marriage was submitted to Parliament. 76 out of the 199 voting MPs had signed their support for the draft bill, and several additional members were expected to vote for it, including Prime Minister Jyrki Katainen. On 27 February 2013, the bill was voted down by the Legal Affairs Committee in a 9–8 vote. After being turned down by the committee, a similar bill was put forward as a citizens' initiative, organised by the Tahdon2013 campaign ("I do 2013"). The campaign started to gather signatures on 19 March 2013, and by the evening of the first day, the initiative had gathered over 90,000 online signatures, eventually reaching a total of 166,851 signatures. The required minimum for an initiative to be sent to Parliament is 50,000 signatures.

Citizens' initiatives had only been possible in Finland since 2012. Therefore, in March 2013, it was still unclear whether a citizens' initiative would be considered on equal footing with a government bill (hallituksen esitys, regeringens proposition), or a member's initiative (lakialoite, lagmotion). Members' initiatives signed by at least 100 MPs are given precedence in the legislative process, while initiatives with less signatures mostly expire at the end of the legislative session. In April 2013, the Speaker's Council of Parliament issued recommendations on how citizens' initiatives are to proceed in Parliament. All initiatives shall be sent to a committee chosen by the plenary session of Parliament. The committee should inform signatories of the initiative within six months on how the committee plans to handle the matter (e.g. by holding hearings with specialists), whether to recommend the initiative for a vote in the plenary session, etc. The committee has full authority on the matter and works independently.

Signature gathering for the same-sex marriage initiative ended after the standard six months period in September 2013, and the initiative was submitted to Parliament on 13 December 2013. In February 2014, the initiative was sent to the Legal Affairs Committee. The committee voted unanimously to schedule a public hearing for 13 March 2014. After the public hearing, Yle reported that the initiative would be sent to the plenary session and not die in the committee. On 25 June 2014, after multiple committee hearings with experts, the Legal Affairs Committee voted 10–6 against same-sex marriage. The vote would have been closer but two members in favour of same-sex marriage missed the vote and were replaced by one substitute member against it.

On 20 November 2014, the committee voted 9–8 for recommending that the Parliament reject the same-sex marriage legislation. In the bill's first reading on 28 November 2014, the full session of Parliament, by a vote of 92–105, did not accept that recommendation. Due to the Parliament not accepting the recommendation, the Grand Committee continued consideration of the initiative on 3 December 2014, eventually voting 17–8 in favour. The legislation was approved 101–90 by the full session of Parliament in its final reading on 12 December, and was signed into law by President Sauli Niinistö on 20 February 2015. The law amended the Marriage Act to define marriage as the union of "two people". Parliament also approved a statement requiring the next government to draft necessary amendments to other relevant acts to replace specific references to opposite-sex couples with gender-neutral language. The law took effect on 1 March 2017.

In 2014, thousands of Finns resigned from the Evangelical Lutheran Church of Finland due to comments made by church officials supporting the new legislation.

a. The Speaker votes only in unusual circumstances, and serves as one of the 200 members of Parliament. 
b. The Swedish-speaking Finns' parliamentary group consisted of nine Swedish People's Party members and one independent representing the autonomous region of Åland.

2015–2019 parliamentary term
Following elections in April 2015, a new more conservative government was formed, consisting of the Centre Party, the Finns Party and the National Coalition Party. Despite a majority of its MPs having voted against same-sex marriage, it was supposed to introduce amendments to other acts which still referred to married spouses as "man and woman". While the Finns Party thought the gender-neutral marriage law should be repealed, the other two parties generally disagreed. The opposition parties, with the exception of the Christian Democrats, were almost completely in favour of amending the other acts to replace gender-specific references with gender-neutral language.

On 22 October 2015, the Parliament started to debate legislation to amend other acts that still had specific references to opposite-sex couples. Minister of Justice Jari Lindström from the Finns Party, who introduced the bill, said he did so despite his personal opposition. On 11 December 2015, the Legal Affairs Committee recommended the adoption of the bill with amendments. The bill was approved by Parliament in a 106–42 vote on 17 February 2016. It was signed by President Niinistö on 8 April 2016 and took effect on 1 March 2017, on the same day as the amendments to the Marriage Act. Among laws amended were the Act on Population Information System and the certificate services of the Population Register Centre (661/2009), the Act on Legal Recognition of the Gender of Transsexuals (563/2002), and the Religious Freedom Act (453/2003).

a. The Speaker votes only in unusual circumstances, though he or she continues to serve as one of the 200 members of Parliament. 

A bill to make necessary changes to social benefits and social and health care services was introduced on 3 November 2016, and approved by the Parliament in a 128–28 vote on 13 December 2016. It was signed by President Niinistö on 13 January 2017, and took effect alongside the amendments to the Marriage Act on 1 March.

a. The Speaker votes only in unusual circumstances, though he or she continues to serve as one of the 200 members of Parliament. 
b. The nine deputies of the Swedish People's Party that were present accidentally voted against the bill, although the entire group supported it.
c. Both SDP MP Henry Wallin and Finns Party MP Mika Niikko reported that they had intended to vote "No".

A citizens' initiative to repeal the gender-neutral marriage law was started on 29 March 2015. The initiative collected almost 110,000 signatures by 29 September 2015 and was presented to the Parliament on 22 June 2016. On 8 September 2016, it was sent to the Legal Affairs Committee after a plenary debate. On 15 February 2017, the committee recommended that the Parliament reject the initiative. On 17 February, the Parliament voted to accept the committee's recommendation by a 120–48 margin with 2 abstentions.

a. The Speaker votes only in unusual circumstances, though he or she continues to serve as one of the 200 members of Parliament.
b. Swedish People's Party MP Eva Biaudet and Green MP Krista Mikkonen stated that they voted incorrectly, as they were both registered as absent. They both intended to vote "Yes" on the committee report.

Statistics

Registered partnerships
4,215 registered partnerships were established in Finland between 2002 and 2017, with a high of 446 partnerships in 2002 and a low of 36 partnerships in 2017.

Marriages
In the first month following the entry into force of the gender-neutral marriage law, 857 same-sex marriages took place in Finland, of which 87 were newly performed and 770 were registered partnerships converted to marriages. By August 2017, 1,578 same-sex marriages had taken place in the country, of which 456 were new marriages and 1,122 were partnerships converted to marriages.

The following table shows the number of marriages and divorces performed in Finland as per data published by Statistics Finland. It does not include conversions from registered partnerships.

Religious performance
Same-sex marriage remains a controversial matter in the Evangelical Lutheran Church of Finland, the largest Christian denomination in Finland. Many priests officiate at same-sex marriages and offer their blessings to the unions. However, the matter is contentious within the church. In November 2020, a group of ministers opposed to same-sex marriage called on the church synod to sanction priests who officiate at such marriages. Archbishop Tapio Luoma has called on dioceses not to sanction priests who perform marriages for same-sex couples, saying that the issue "cannot be settled by sanctions" but that "any solution for the church must be based on the fact that there can be disagreement on the matter". A 2019 survey conducted by the University of Eastern Finland showed that 57% of priests in the Evangelical Lutheran Church would marry same-sex couples if explicitly permitted by the church leadership to do so.

In September 2020, the Supreme Administrative Court of Finland ruled that diocesan chapters may sanction priests who perform same-sex marriages. The Diocese of Helsinki has taken a position not to issue warnings to priests who perform same-sex marriages.

Public opinion
Support for same-sex marriage in Finland has grown gradually since the 2000s. A December 2006 EU poll put Finnish support for same-sex marriage at 45%, while an August 2010 survey conducted by Yle put support at 54% with 35% opposing it. In January 2013, a poll by YouGov showed that support had increased to 57%, with 32% opposed and 12% unsure. In the same survey, support for adoption by same-sex couples was 51%, with 36% opposed and 13% unsure. A March 2013 survey by Taloustutkimus found that 58% of Finns supported same-sex marriage. In March 2014, a follow-up Taloustutkimus survey put support at 65% with 27% opposing and 8% unsure.

A June 2014 survey showed that among clergy of the Evangelical Lutheran Church, 44% supported a gender-neutral marriage law, while 41% were opposed and 15% were neutral. 60% supported church blessings for registered partners, and 28% said the church should abandon the legislated duty to perform marriages if a gender-neutral marriage law is passed.

The 2015 Eurobarometer found that 66% of Finns thought same-sex marriage should be allowed throughout Europe, while 28% were opposed.

A Pew Research Center poll, conducted between April and August 2017 and published in May 2018, showed that 64% of Finns supported same-sex marriage, 26% were opposed and 10% did not know or refused to answer. When divided by religion, 84% of religiously unaffiliated people, 62% of non-practicing Christians and 30% of church-attending Christians supported same-sex marriage. Opposition was 12% among 18–34-year-olds.

The 2019 Eurobarometer found that 76% of Finns thought same-sex marriage should be allowed throughout Europe, while 21% were opposed.

Regional significance
Finland was the last Nordic country to introduce same-sex marriage. Although the change has brought it into alignment with its Nordic neighbours, this represents a significant difference of approach to neighbouring Russia, which historically exercised influence in Finland's affairs through Finlandisation and is hostile to LGBT rights.

See also 

LGBT rights in Finland
LGBT history in Finland
Recognition of same-sex unions in Europe

Notes

References

External links
 
 
 
 
 
 
 
 
 
 
 
 
 
 
 

LGBT rights in Finland
Finland
2017 in LGBT history